Wistman's Wood is one of three remote high-altitude oakwoods on Dartmoor, Devon, England.

Geography
The wood lies at an altitude of 380–410 metres in the valley of the West Dart River near Two Bridges, at grid reference SX612772.

The source of the Devonport Leat, at a weir on the West Dart River, is just north of the wood.

Preservation status
The wood is one of the highest oakwoods in Britain and, as an outstanding example of native upland oak woodland, was selected as a Site of Special Scientific Interest in 1964. It is also an NCR site and forms part of the Wistman's Wood National Nature Reserve. The wood was also one of the primary reasons for selection of the Dartmoor Special Area of Conservation.

The other two high-altitude oakwoods of Dartmoor are Black Tor Copse on the West Okement River in the north, and Piles Copse on the River Erme in the south.

Description
These occupy the sheltered, south-west facing slope of the valley, where a bank of large granite boulders ("clatter") is exposed, and pockets of acidic, free-draining, brown earth soils have accumulated. Additional copses of scrub extend beyond the main body of the wood, suggesting that it originally extended over the entirety of the clatter deposits on the hillside. In the present day, the clatter outside of the main wood is covered in bracken, bilberry, and occasional gorse.

Wistman's Wood is owned by the Duchy of Cornwall and has been managed since 1961 under a nature reserve agreement with the Nature Conservancy Council, English Nature and Natural England. The wood has no active management, but many people visit the site on foot (mostly accessing the southern end of South Wood), and cattle and sheep have free access where the terrain permits, outside of a small fenced exclosure in South Wood.

Flora
The trees within the wood are mainly pedunculate oak, with occasional rowan, and a very few holly, hawthorn, hazel, and eared-willow. The trees also developed highly contorted forms with procumbent trunks, and their main branches tend to lie on or between the rocks on the forest floor.

Tree branches are characteristically festooned with a variety of epiphytic mosses and lichens and, sometimes, by grazing-sensitive species such as bilberry and polypody. The horizontal habit of the trunks and limbs allows organic debris and humus to accumulate on them, favoring extensive growth of epiphytic vascular plants. These occur in much greater variety than in other British woodlands; in addition to polypody, which is the most common recorded epiphyte, and bilberry, these include many of the same species found on the forest floor.

On the ground, boulders are usually covered by lichens and mossy patches – frequent species include Dicranum scoparium, Hypotrachyna laevigata, Rhytidiadelphus loreus and Sphaerophorus globosus – and, where soil has accumulated, patches of acid grassland grow with heath bedstraw, tormentil and sorrel. In places protected from livestock, grazing-sensitive plants such as wood sorrel, bilberry, wood rush and bramble occur. A fringe of bracken surrounds much of the wood, demarcating the extent of brown earth soils. The wood supports approximately 120 species of lichen.

Fauna
The wood is home to a large population of adders.

History
Wistman's Wood has been mentioned in writing for hundreds of years. It is likely to be a left-over from the ancient forest that covered much of Dartmoor c. 7000 BCE, before Mesolithic hunter/gatherers cleared it around 5000 BCE. Photographic and other records show that Wistman's Wood has changed considerably since the mid-19th century; at the same time climatic conditions have also generally become warmer. Over this period, the older oak trees have grown from a stunted/semi-prostrate to a more ascending form, while a new generation of mostly straight-grown and single-stemmed oaks has developed. The oldest oaks appear to be 400–500 years old, and originated within a degenerating oakwood that survived in scrub form during two centuries of cold climate. In c. 1620 these old trees were described as "no taller than a man may touch to top with his head". Tree height increased somewhat by the mid-19th century, and during the 20th century approximately doubled (in 1997 the maximum and average height of trees was around 12 m and 7 m respectively). In addition, a wave of marginal new oaks arose after c. 1900, roughly doubling the area of wood. Part of the evidence for these changes comes from a permanent vegetation plot located in the southern end of South Wood. This is the oldest known of its kind in British woodland, with a small part having been recorded by R. Hansford Worth in 1921.

The Buller Stone, a boulder to the east of the wood, commemorates an attempt in 1866 to date the trees, when Wentworth Buller (with permission from the Duchy) felled an oak. It has been estimated to be 168 years old.

Myths, art and literature
The wood has been the inspiration for numerous artists, poets, and photographers. It appears in hundreds of 19th century accounts. One tradition holds that it was planted by Isabella de Fortibus (1237–93).

The wood is described in detail and discussed as a point of great interest in The Tree (1978), an essay on naturalism by English novelist John Fowles.

The name of Wistman's Wood may derive from the dialect word "wisht", meaning "eerie/uncanny" or "pixie-led/haunted". The legendary Wild Hunt in Devon, whose hellhounds are known as Yeth (Heath) or Wisht Hounds in the Devonshire dialect, is particularly associated with Wistman's Wood.

References

Bibliography

Dartmoor
Folklore
Forests and woodlands of Devon
National nature reserves in England
Sites of Special Scientific Interest in Devon
Sites of Special Scientific Interest notified in 1964
Woodland Sites of Special Scientific Interest